Melrose Public Schools is the school district for Melrose, Massachusetts. The district controls several schools in the city and is led by superintendent Dr. Julie Kukenberger. Its offices are located at 360 Lynn Fells Parkway in Melrose.

History
Public schooling in the area that is currently Melrose was initially under the control of the City of Malden. In 1850, the north end of Malden broke off and became the Town of Melrose, eventually becoming the City of Melrose in 1900. At the time of its separation, Melrose contained several small schoolhouses dispersed around the town. These schoolhouses formed the beginnings of Melrose Public Schools.

School Committee 
The current members of the Melrose school committee are Lizbeth DeSelm, Paul Brodeur (Mayor), Margaret Raymond Driscoll (Vice Chair), Ed O’Connell (Chair), John Obremski, Jen McAndrew, and Jennifer Razi-Thomas. School committee meetings are televised on local public-access television station MMTV and recordings are available on the MMTV website.

Current schools

Former schools

References

External links
 Melrose Public Schools

Melrose, Massachusetts
School districts in Massachusetts
Education in Middlesex County, Massachusetts
School districts established in 1850